Dentsville is a census-designated place (CDP) in Richland County, South Carolina, United States. The population was 14,062 at the 2010 census. It is part of the Columbia, South Carolina, Metropolitan Statistical Area.

Geography
Dentsville is located at  (34.075403, -80.955207).

Demographics

2020 census

As of the 2020 United States census, there were 14,431 people, 6,403 households, and 3,599 families residing in the CDP.

2000 census
As of the census of 2000, there were 13,009 people, 5,376 households, and 3,290 families residing in the CDP. The population density was 1,844.8 people per square mile (712.5/km2). There were 5,797 housing units at an average density of 822.1 per square mile (317.5/km2). The racial makeup of the CDP was 36.05% White, 58.28% African American, 0.21% Native American, 2.54% Asian, 0.05% Pacific Islander, 1.30% from other races, and 1.58% from two or more races. Hispanic or Latino of any race were 2.90% of the population.

There were 5,376 households, out of which 26.9% had children under the age of 18 living with them, 38.1% were married couples living together, 18.7% had a female householder with no husband present, and 38.8% were non-families. 32.2% of all households were made up of individuals, and 6.4% had someone living alone who was 65 years of age or older. The average household size was 2.30 and the average family size was 2.91.

In the CDP, the population was spread out, with 21.6% under the age of 18, 9.5% from 18 to 24, 34.6% from 25 to 44, 22.2% from 45 to 64, and 12.1% who were 65 years of age or older. The median age was 35 years. For every 100 females, there were 80.7 males. For every 100 females age 18 and over, there were 74.8 males.

The median income for a household in the CDP was $38,721, and the median income for a family was $46,996. Males had a median income of $32,015 versus $23,726 for females. The per capita income for the CDP was $19,916. About 7.1% of families and 8.6% of the population were below the poverty line, including 9.9% of those under age 18 and 5.9% of those age 65 or over.

References

Census-designated places in Richland County, South Carolina
Census-designated places in South Carolina
Columbia metropolitan area (South Carolina)